Funk is a genre of music.

Funk or Funky may also refer to:

Places
Funk, Nebraska, United States, a village
Funk, Ohio, United States, an unincorporated community
Funk Glacier, Graham Land, Antarctica
Funk House (disambiguation), various houses on US National Register of Historic Places
Funk Island, Newfoundland, Canada

People
Funk (surname), a family name (including a list of people)
Funky (artist), Puerto Rican rapper and songwriter

Aircraft
Funk B, a 1930s aircraft made by the Funk Aircraft Company
Funk F-23, a 1960s agricultural aircraft

Arts, entertainment, and media

Music
Funk (album), 2002, by Bulldog Mansion
"F.U.N.K.", a 2007 song by Prince
"Funk", a 2020 song by Meghan Trainor from her album Treat Myself
"Funk #49", 1970 song by James Gang
Funky (The Spencer Davis Group album)
Funky (Gene Ammons album), 1957

Other uses in arts, entertainment, and media
"Funk" (Glee), a TV series episode
Funk art, a figurative art movement from the 1950s and 1960s
Funk carioca, known as funk in Brazil

Other uses
Funk, a temporary depressive episode
FUNK, Front Uni National du Kampuchéa or National United Front of Kampuchea, a coalition of Sihanoukists and the Khmer Rouge
Funk & Wagnalls, a New York City publisher
Funk (service), a public streaming service in Germany

See also
Depression - "funk" can mean "a depressed mood" (Webster's NWD 1979).
Panic - "funk" can mean "cowering through fear"; "panic" (Webster's NWD 1979).
Fun 9, a 1999 album by Takako Minekawa, pronounced funk when 9 is spoken in Japanese
Funck, a surname
Funcke, a surname
Funke, a surname
Phonk, a subgenre of hip hop and trap music